The 1967 Dutch Grand Prix was a Formula One motor race held at Zandvoort on June 4, 1967. It was race 3 of 11 in both the 1967 World Championship of Drivers and the 1967 International Cup for Formula One Manufacturers.
The race saw the debut of the Lotus 49, equipped with the Ford Cosworth DFV engine. Having tested it for a long time, Graham Hill took pole for the race. By contrast, this was the first time that the other Lotus driver, Jim Clark, ever drove the car, which — combined with mechanical issues — led to him only qualifying in eighth. Hill retired from the lead while Clark started to get a feel for the car as he fought his way to the field to record the car's first victory in its first race. The meeting also saw the first appearance of the Brabham BT24 and the BRM P115, but neither took part in the race.

This was the last Grand Prix for the Lotus 25. Chassis R4 being driven by Chris Irwin, was the same chassis used by Jim Clark to win the 1963 World Title.

Classification

Qualifying

Race

Championship standings after the race

Drivers' Championship standings

Constructors' Championship standings

 Notes: Only the top five positions are included for both sets of standings.

References

Further reading

Dutch Grand Prix
Dutch Grand Prix
Grand Prix
Dutch Grand Prix